Shantanu Narayen (born May 27, 1963) is an Indian-American business executive. He has been the chairman, president, and chief executive officer (CEO) of Adobe Inc. since December 2007. Before this, he was the company's president and chief operating officer since 2005.

Early life and education 
Narayen grew up in Hyderabad, India, in a Telugu-speaking family, and was the second son of a mother who taught American literature and a father who ran a plastics company. He attended Hyderabad Public School.

He earned a bachelor's degree in electronics and communication engineering from University College of Engineering, Osmania University in Hyderabad. He moved to the United States to complete his education, and in 1986 received a master's degree in computer science from Bowling Green State University in Ohio. In 1993 he received an MBA from the Haas School of Business, University of California, Berkeley.

Career

Early career 
In 1986 Narayen joined a Silicon Valley start-up called Measurex Automation Systems, which made computer control systems for automotive and electronics customers. He then moved to Apple, where he was in senior management positions from 1989 to 1995.

After Apple, he served as director of desktop and collaboration products for Silicon Graphics. In 1996 co-founded Pictra Inc., a company that pioneered the concept of digital photo sharing over the Internet.

Adobe 
Narayen joined Adobe in 1998 as senior vice-president of worldwide product development, a position he held through 2001. From 2001 to 2005 he was executive vice-president of worldwide products.

In 2005 he was appointed president and chief operating officer.

CEO 
In November 2007, Adobe announced that Bruce Chizen would step down as CEO effective December 1, 2007, to be replaced by Narayen.

As CEO, Narayen led the transformation of the company, moving its creative and digital document software franchises – which include flagship programs such as Photoshop, Premiere Pro, and Acrobat/PDF – from the desktop to the cloud. In addition, during his tenure as CEO, Adobe has entered the digital experiences category, an expansion which began with the company’s acquisition of Omniture in 2009.

In 2018 Adobe exceeded $100 billion in market cap and joined the Fortune 400 for the first time. In 2018 it also ranked No. 13 on Forbes’ Most Innovative Companies list.

Honors and awards 
In May 2011, Narayen received an honorary doctorate from his alma mater, Bowling Green State University.

In 2011, Barack Obama appointed him as a member of his Management Advisory Board.

Narayen is the lead independent director on the board of directors for Pfizer, and vice chairman of the US-India Strategic Partnership Forum.

In 2018, Narayen was ranked #12 on Fortune'''s "Businessperson of the Year" list, and was deemed "Global Indian of the Year" in 2018 by The Economic Times'' of India.

In 2019, he was a recipient of India's Padma Shri award.

Personal life 
Narayen lives in Palo Alto, California. He met his wife Reni while at Bowling Green State University in the mid 1980s; she has a doctorate in clinical psychology. They have two sons.

He once represented India in sailing at an Asian Regatta. He, along with Satya Nadella, has also invested in Major League Cricket to be hosted by the American Cricket Enterprises (ACE).

References

External links 

 Adobe.com: Shantanu Narayen

Living people
Telugu people
Businesspeople from Hyderabad, India
American technology chief executives
Haas School of Business alumni
Indian technology chief executives
Indian emigrants to the United States
Adobe Inc. people
Silicon Graphics people
Osmania University alumni
Bowling Green State University alumni
Businesspeople in computing
Pfizer people
American chief operating officers
Recipients of the Padma Shri in trade and industry
20th-century American businesspeople
21st-century American businesspeople
American people of Indian descent
American computer businesspeople
American chief executives
American chief executives of Fortune 500 companies
Chief executives in the technology industry
American people of Telugu descent
American computer scientists
1963 births